Sir Paul Methuen  (c. 1672 – 11 April 1757), of Bishops Cannings, Wiltshire, was an English diplomat and Whig politician who sat in the House of Commons between 1708 and 1747. He was an envoy to Portugal between 1697 and 1708 and later a holder of public offices, particularly in the Royal household.

Early life
Methuen was born in Bradford-on-Avon, Wiltshire, the son of John Methuen and his wife Mary Cheevers, daughter of Seacole Cheevers (or Chivers). His parents' marriage was unhappy and they separated when he was in his teens. His father inherited the lease of the manor of Bishops Cannings, near Devizes. He was educated privately and then at a Jesuit school in Paris.

Diplomatic career
Methuen went to Lisbon in 1691, when his father was appointed minister there. He gained valuable diplomatic experience and the esteem of King Pedro. During two absences of his father, he became chargé d'affaires, rising to Minister on his father's appointment as Lord Chancellor of Ireland in 1697. He was unable to prevent a Portuguese-French alliance in 1701. When his father returned to Portugal as a special envoy in 1702, they were successful in breaking the alliance in 1703. That led to the Methuen commercial treaty between England and Portugal, the basis of Britain's monopoly of Portuguese trade for much of the 18th century. His father remained in Portugal as ambassador. In 1705, Methuen served with the army, being present at the capture of Gibraltar. On his return to England to obtain military supplies he was appointed Minister to Savoy, but succeeded his father as ambassador to Portugal on the latter's death in July 1706.

Political career
Methuen was still abroad when he was elected Whig Member of Parliament (MP) for Devizes at the 1708 general election. He served on three committees, including one on 9 March 1709 to draft a bill to prohibit French wines and other products more effectively, reflecting his mercantile connections and experience in negotiating commercial treaties. Also in 1709, he supported the naturalization of the Palatines. He was appointed as a Lord of the Admiralty in November 1709, and was returned unopposed at the ensuing by-election. At the 1710 general election, he was returned initially at Devizes in a double return but his opponents were declared elected. He asked to be removed from the Admiralty board, because he considered himself unsuitable, and refused another public office. At the 1713 British general election, he was returned in a contest as MP for Brackley (Northamptonshire) in the interest of the Duke of Bridgwater, but was unseated on petition on 20 April 1714. He was appointed a Lord of the Treasury and was sworn as a Privy Councillor on 29 October 1714.

At the 1715 general election, Methuen was returned unopposed as MP for Brackley. In 1715, he was sent as ambassador to Spain and Morocco to negotiate a commercial treaty, but had to return because of ill health. He became Secretary of State for the Southern Department in 1716, but resigned with Robert Walpole in 1717.  When Walpole resumed office in 1720, he became Comptroller of the Royal Household. He appears to have sold the lease of Bishop's Cannings in 1720. At the 1722 election, he was returned unopposed at Brackley and exchanged office in 1725 to become Treasurer of the Household. He was made a Knight of the Bath by George I in May 1725. He was returned as MP for Brackley in the general elections of 1727, 1734 and 1741, but after the death of his patron the Duke of Bridgwater, he was not put forward for Brackley at the 1747 election.

Death and legacy
Methuen died, unmarried, in 1757, and was buried in the south aisle of Westminster Abbey, near his father John. His only brother Henry had been killed in a brawl in Lisbon in 1694. His heir was his cousin Paul Methuen, for whom he bought Corsham Court. That Paul's grandson was created Baron Methuen.

His bust by Peter Scheemakers is in the family home of Corsham Court in Wiltshire.

Methuen, Massachusetts, was named after him.

Notes

References
 Karl Wolfgang Schweizer, 'Methuen, Sir Paul (c.1672–1757)’, Oxford Dictionary of National Biography, (Oxford University Press, Sept 2004; online edn, Oct 2008) , accessed 3 November 2008.
 G. F. R. Barker, 'Methuen, John (1650–1706)’, rev. Thomas Doyle, Oxford Dictionary of National Biography, (Oxford University Press, 2004; online edn, Oct 2008) , accessed 4 November 2008.
 Burke's Peerage (1939 edition), s.v. Methuen.

1670s births
1757 deaths
Burials at Westminster Abbey
Ambassadors of England to Spain
Knights Commander of the Order of the Bath
Lords of the Admiralty
Members of the Parliament of Great Britain for English constituencies
Members of the Privy Council of Great Britain
Paul
Secretaries of State for the Southern Department
Treasurers of the Household
Ambassadors of England to Portugal
Ambassadors of Great Britain to Portugal
17th-century English diplomats